Baksey Chamkrong FC, is a football (soccer) club in Cambodia. It plays in the Cambodian League the top division of Cambodian football.

Football clubs in Cambodia